The Tanohata Formation is a Mesozoic geologic formation in northeastern Japan. Dinosaur remains diagnostic to the genus level are among the fossils that have been recovered from the formation.

See also

 List of dinosaur-bearing rock formations
 List of stratigraphic units with few dinosaur genera

Footnotes

References
 Weishampel, David B.; Dodson, Peter; and Osmólska, Halszka (eds.): The Dinosauria, 2nd, Berkeley: University of California Press. 861 pp. .

Geologic formations of Japan
Aptian Stage